The Ladykillers is a 1955 British black comedy crime film directed by Alexander Mackendrick for Ealing Studios. It stars Alec Guinness, Cecil Parker, Herbert Lom, Peter Sellers, Danny Green, Jack Warner, and Katie Johnson as the old lady, Mrs. Wilberforce.

William Rose wrote the screenplay, for which he was nominated for an Academy Award for Best Original Screenplay and won the BAFTA Award for Best British Screenplay. He claimed to have dreamt the entire film and merely had to remember the details when he awoke.

Plot 
Mrs Wilberforce is a sweet and eccentric old widow who lives alone with her raucous parrots in a gradually subsiding lopsided house, built over the entrance to a railway tunnel in Kings Cross, London. With nothing to occupy her time and an active imagination, she is a frequent visitor to the local police station where she reports fanciful suspicions regarding neighbourhood activities. Having led wild-goose chases in the past, she is humoured by the officers there who give her reports no credence whatsoever.

She is approached by an archly sinister character, "Professor" Marcus, who wants to rent rooms in her house. She is not aware that he has assembled a gang of hardened criminals for a sophisticated security van robbery at London King's Cross railway station: the gentlemanly and easily fooled con-man Major Claude Courtney; the comedic Cockney spiv Harry Robinson; the slow-witted and punch drunk ex-boxer 'One-Round' Lawson; and the murderous, cruel and vicious continental gangster Louis Harvey. As a cover, the "Professor" convinces the naive Mrs. Wilberforce that the group is an amateur string quintet using the rooms for rehearsal space. To maintain the deception, the gang members carry musical instruments and play recordings of Boccherini's Minuet (3rd movement) from String Quintet in E, Op. 11 No. 5 and Haydn's Serenade for Strings Op. 3 No. 5 (the "Serenade" was actually composed by Roman Hoffstetter) during their planning sessions.

After the heist, "Mrs. W" is deceived into retrieving the disguised money from the railway station herself. This she successfully manages to do, but not without serious complications owing to her tendency to righteous meddling. As the gang departs her house with the loot, 'One-Round' accidentally gets his cello case full of banknotes trapped in the front door. As he pulls the case free, banknotes spill forth while Mrs. Wilberforce looks on. Finally, smelling a rat, she informs Marcus that she is going to the police.

Stalling, the gangsters half convince Mrs. W that she will surely be considered an accomplice for holding the cash. In any case, they assert, it is a victimless crime as insurance will cover all the losses and the police will probably not even accept the money back. She wavers, but when she rallies, the criminals finally decide they must kill her. No one wants to do it, so they draw lots using matchsticks. The Major loses but tries to make a run for it with the cash. As the oblivious Mrs. W dozes, the criminals cross, double-cross and manage to kill one another in rapid succession. The Major falls off the roof of the house after being chased by Louis; Harry is killed by One-Round who, after having had a change of heart about the killing of Mrs. W, wrongly thinks that Harry has killed her; One-Round tries to shoot Louis and Marcus when he overhears a plan to double-cross him, but leaves the gun's safety catch on and is himself killed by Louis; Marcus kills Louis by dislodging his ladder under the tunnel behind the house, causing Louis to fall into a passing railway wagon. Before falling into the carriage, Louis fires a last shot at Marcus which nearly hits him. Finally, with no one else left, Marcus himself is struck on the head by a changing railway signal, and his body drops into another wagon. All the other bodies have been dumped into railway wagons passing behind the house and are now far away.

Mrs. Wilberforce is now left alone with the plunder. She goes to the police to return it, but they do not believe her story. They humour her, telling her to keep the money. She is puzzled but finally relents and returns home. Along the way, she leaves a banknote of large denomination with a startled starving artist.

Cast

Alec Guinness as Professor Marcus
Cecil Parker as Major Claude Courtney
Herbert Lom as Louis Harvey
Peter Sellers as Harry Robinson
Danny Green as 'One-Round' Lawson
Jack Warner as the Superintendent
Katie Johnson as Mrs Louisa Wilberforce
Philip Stainton as the Station Sergeant
Frankie Howerd as the barrow boy

Kenneth Connor appears in an uncredited role as the taxi driver. Alec Guinness seems to have based his performance of Professor Marcus on the actor Alastair Sim, for whom the part was originally intended. Robinson was the first major film role for Peter Sellers; he would later appear with Lom in five of The Pink Panther films. Sellers and Guinness would appear together again in Murder By Death (1976).

Awards and nominations

Reception

Box office
According to the National Film Finance Corporation, the film made a comfortable profit.

Critical response
The film received critical acclaim from critics. On review aggregator Rotten Tomatoes, the film holds a rare approval rating of 100% based on 31 reviews, with an average score of 8.7/10. The website's consensus reads, "The Ladykillers is a macabre slow-burn with quirky performances of even quirkier characters." On Metacritic, the film received a score of 91 based on 7 reviews, indicating "universal acclaim".

The British Film Institute ranked The Ladykillers the 13th greatest British film of all time. In 2017 a poll of 150 actors, directors, writers, producers and critics for Time Out magazine saw it ranked the 29th best British film ever.

Reputation
In 2000, readers of Total Film magazine voted The Ladykillers the 36th greatest comedy film of all time, and The Guardian labelled it the 5th greatest comedy of all time in 2010.

Adaptations

In 1966 the film was adapted into an opera by the Czech composer Ilja Hurník under the name The Lady and the Robbers (Dáma a lupiči), which was premiered in Brno in October 1973.
A radio adaptation of the film, by Bruce Bedford, was first broadcast on BBC Radio 4 on 13 January 1996 starring Edward Petherbridge and Margot Boyd.
In 2004 the Coen Brothers directed an American remake of the film, starring Tom Hanks, Irma P. Hall, Marlon Wayans, J. K. Simmons, Tzi Ma and Ryan Hurst. The setting of the film is moved from London to Saucier, Mississippi, home of a riverboat casino.
In 2011 the film was adapted as a play by Graham Linehan. It premiered at the Liverpool Playhouse in November that year before transferring to the Gielgud Theatre in London with Peter Capaldi as Professor Marcus.
The play was revived at the London Vaudeville Theatre in 2013 and subsequently toured around the UK and Ireland. This revived production featured a new cast.
The play had its North American premiere at the Shaw Festival in Niagara-on-the-Lake, Ontario, Canada in June 2019 with Damien Atkins as Professor Marcus and Chick Reid as Mrs. Wilberforce.

See also
 BFI Top 100 British films
 The Pardoner's Tale

References

External links

 
 
 
 
 Then and now photographs of locations
 Brief YouTube documentary on locations used in 'The Ladykillers'
 Locations used in 'The Ladykillers' at Reelstreets.com

1955 comedy films
1955 films
Cultural depictions of Metropolitan Police officers
1950s black comedy films
1950s crime comedy films
1950s heist films
British black comedy films
British crime comedy films
British heist films
Ealing Studios films
Films adapted into operas
Films directed by Alexander Mackendrick
Films produced by Michael Balcon
Films set in London
1950s English-language films
1950s British films